Thinking outside the box (also thinking out of the box or thinking beyond the box and, especially in Australia, thinking outside the square) is a metaphor that means to think differently, unconventionally, or from a new perspective. The phrase also often refers to novel or creative thinking.

History

The origin of the phrase is unclear. "Think beyond the boundary"-metaphors, that is, metaphors that allude to think differently or with less constraints, seem to have an old history. For example, in 1888, The Annual Register records the phrase think outside the lines.

Since at least 1954, the nine dots puzzle has been used as a metaphor of the type "think beyond the boundary". Early phrasings include go outside the dots (1954), breakthrough thinking that gets outside the nine-dot square (1959), and what are the actual boundaries of the problem? (1963).

In 1969, Norman Vincent Peale writes this in an article for the Chicago Tribune, quote:

In 1970, the phrase think outside the dots appears without mentioning the nine dots puzzle.

Finally, in 1971, the specific phrase think outside the box is attested, again appearing together with the nine dots puzzle. In 1976, the phrase is used in England and 1978 in the USA, both without mentioning the nine dots puzzle.

Beyond the above attestations, there are several unconfirmed accounts of how the phrase got introduced. According to Martin Kihn, it goes back to management consultants in the 1970s and 1980s challenging their clients to solve the "nine dots" puzzle. According to John Adair, he introduced the nine dots puzzle in 1969, from which the saying comes. According to The Creative Thinking Association of America, Mike Vance popularized the phrase "thinking out of the box". Moreover, it is claimed that the use of the nine-dot puzzle in consultancy circles stems from the corporate culture of the Walt Disney Company, where the puzzle was used in-house.

See also
 Egg of Columbus
 Einstellung effect
 Eureka effect
 Functional fixedness
 Gordian Knot
 Kobayashi Maru
 Lateral thinking

References

Further reading
   (more solutions to the nine dots problem - with less than 4 lines!)

External links

 Out-of-the-box vs. outside the box citing Oxford Advanced Learners Dictionary (OALD), Word of the Month

Creativity
Problem solving skills
Systems thinking